The 2003 Men's World Water Polo Championship was the tenth edition of the men's water polo tournament at the World Aquatics Championships, organised by the world governing body in aquatics, the FINA. The tournament was held from 14 to 26 July 2003, and was incorporated into the 2003 World Aquatics Championships in Barcelona, Spain.

Participating teams

Groups formed

Group A
 
 
 
 

Group B
 
 
 
 

Group C
 
 
 
 

Group D

Preliminary round

Group A

 July 14, 2003

 July 16, 2003

 July 18, 2003

Group B

 July 14, 2003

 July 16, 2003

 July 18, 2003

Group C

 July 14, 2003

 July 16, 2003

 July 18, 2003

Group D

 July 14, 2003

 July 16, 2003

 July 18, 2003

Playoff round
 July 20, 2003

Final round

Quarter finals
 July 22, 2003

Semi finals
 July 24, 2003

Finals
 July 26, 2003 —  Bronze Medal Match

 July 26, 2003 —  Gold Medal Match

13th-16th place 

 July 20, 2003

 July 22, 2003

9th-12th place 

 July 22, 2003

 July 24, 2003

5th-8th place 

 July 24, 2003

 July 26, 2003

Final ranking

Medalists

Individual awards
 Most Valuable Player
 

 Best Goalkeeper
 

 Topscorer

References

External links
 Barcelona 2003 FINA World Championships
 10th FINA World Championships 2003 FINA Water Polo website
 Men Water Polo X World Championship 2003 Barcelona www.todor66.com

Men's tournament
2003